Georgia–Mexico relations are the international relations between Georgia and Mexico. Both nations are members of the United Nations.

History
Diplomatic relations between Georgia and Mexico were established on 8 June 1992 soon after the dissolution of the Soviet Union. Soon after independence, both nations accredited ambassadors to each other via-third nations. Since the establishment of diplomatic relations, official relations between both nations have been limited. 

In 2008, during the Russo-Georgian War; Mexico remained neutral and asked for both sides to seek peace. Mexico has not recognized the independence of Abkhazia nor South Ossetia and sees them as integral parts of Georgia. In September 2010, Georgian Prime Minister Nika Gilauri attended the bicentennial of Mexican Independence. Later that year in December 2010, former Georgian President Mikheil Saakashvili attended the UN Conference on Climate Change (COP16) held in Cancún.

In August 2011, Georgian Foreign Minister Grigol Vashadze paid a visit to Mexico and announced the opening of a Georgian embassy in the country. The embassy was opened later that year in Mexico City. In July 2016, a Mexican Delegation of the Foreign Relations Committee paid a visit to Georgia.

High-level visits
High-level visits from Georgia to Mexico

 Prime Minister Nika Gilauri (2010)
 President Mikheil Saakashvili (2010)
 Foreign Minister Grigol Vashadze (2011)

High-level visits from Mexico to Georgia
 Senator Gabriela Cuevas Barron (2016)

Bilateral agreement
Both nations have agreed on a Memorandum of Understanding for the Establishment of Political Consultations on Issues of Mutual Interest and an Agreement in educational and cultural cooperation (2022).

Trade
In 2019, two-way trade between both nations amounted to US$23 million. Georgia's main exports to Mexico include: magnesium, nails and screws and airplane. Mexico's main exports to Georgia include: tequila, beer and Mexican soap operas.

Resident diplomatic missions
 Georgia has an embassy in Mexico City.
 Mexico is accredited to Georgia from its embassy in Ankara, Turkey and maintains an honorary consulate in Tbilisi.

See also 
 Foreign relations of Georgia
 Foreign relations of Mexico

References

Mexico
Bilateral relations of Mexico